This is a list of Italian football transfers featuring at least one Serie A or Serie B club which were completed after the end of the 2012–13 season and before the end of the 2013 summer transfer window. The window formally opened on 2 July 2013  and closed on 2 September (2 months), but Lega Serie A and Lega Serie B accepted to document any transfer before that day, however those players would only able to play for his new club at the start of 2012–13 season. Free agent could join any club at any time.
This list doesn't include co-ownership resolutions, which had to be renewed or resolved no later than June 20, 2013.

June to July 2013
Legend
Those clubs in Italic indicated that the player already left on loan in previous season or 2013 new signing that immediately left the club
Non-EU transfer from and to abroad were marked yellow, excluding loan deal that turned definitive and renewed loans. Serie A clubs could only signed 2 non-EU players from abroad by certain criteria, such as replace departed non-EU player or the club completely did not have non-EU players.

Footnotes

References
general
 
 
 Lega Pro

specific

Transfers
Italian
2013